Osieki Lęborskie is a non-operational PKP railway station on the disused PKP rail line 230 in Osieki Lęborskie (Pomeranian Voivodeship), Poland. It lies more than a kilometre outside the village proper on the road between Osieki Lęborskie and Lublewo.

Lines crossing the station

References 

Osieki Lęborskie article at Polish Stations Database, URL accessed at 19 March 2006

Railway stations in Pomeranian Voivodeship
Disused railway stations in Pomeranian Voivodeship
Wejherowo County